Duncan James Sinclair (1 July 1867 – 17 August 1943) was a Liberal party member of the House of Commons of Canada. He was born in Brooke Township, Ontario and became a physician.

He was elected to Parliament at the Oxford North riding in the 1921 general election. After serving his only federal term, the 14th Canadian Parliament, Sinclair was defeated in the 1925 federal election by Donald Sutherland of the Conservatives.

External links
 

1867 births
1943 deaths
Physicians from Ontario
Liberal Party of Canada MPs
Members of the House of Commons of Canada from Ontario